Buriano may refer to:

Buriano, Castiglione della Pescaia, a village in the province of Grosseto, Italy
Buriano, Montecatini Val di Cecina, a village in the province of Pisa, Italy
Buriano, Quarrata, a village in the province of Pistoia, Italy